To Those Left Behind is the fifth studio album by American metalcore band Blessthefall. The album was released on September 18, 2015, through Fearless Records and was produced by Joey Sturgis. It is their last album to be released on this label before the band signed to Rise Records in 2018. The first single, "Up in Flames" was released on July 9, 2015, while the band was on Vans Warped Tour 2015.

Background 
The band announced in April that they had entered the studio to work with Joey Sturgis for their fifth album. In June, while on Warped Tour 2015, they gave a September 18 release date through Fearless Records. Of the album, frontman Beau Bokan said, "As a band we are constantly trying to outdo ourselves and take a step forward with each record. With this new album we've taken a giant fucking leap forward and are at our absolute best as musicians and song writers. We're looking forward to seeing where this album will take us." It was announced that if you buy the album from the Merchnow site you will receive a bonus track of the acoustic version of "Condition // Comatose" along with the album.

Critical reception 

The album has been met with positive reviews. Critics gave praise for the album's technical aspects, but noted how the album was predictable and nothing new. In a review for Alternative Press Tyler Davidson writes, "...blessthefall know exactly how to double down on each of those elements, crystallizing the dichotomy in a way that simultaneously serves the genre while still feeling new enough to make a lasting impression." In a more mixed review, Taylor Weston for HM Magazine wrote, "Kudos to them for making sure this latest release didn't enter into the rut of metalcore. It's not a life-changing release, but it's a steady progression of bettering their work that has them around more than a decade after they started." A more favorable review from Outburn, Nathaniel Lay stated, "This is a prime example of metalcore".

The album was included at number 39 on Rock Sounds top 50 releases of 2015 list.

Track listing

Personnel 

Blessthefall
 Eric Lambert – lead guitar, backing clean vocals
 Matt Traynor – drums, percussion
 Jared Warth – unclean vocals, bass guitar
 Beau Bokan – clean vocals
 Elliott Gruenberg – rhythm guitar, additional unclean vocals on track 2

Production
 Joey Sturgis – producer, engineer, mastering, vocal editing, vocal engineer
 Nick Matzkows – editing, engineer, vocal editing, vocal engineer, background vocals
 Erik Ron – vocal editing, vocal engineer, vocal producer
 Joel Wanasek – mixing assistant
 Josh Parpowicz – assistant
 Anthony Reeder – engineer
 Florian Mihr – art direction, layout
 Karl Pfeiffer – photography

Additional musicians
Background vocals –
 Josh Buckner
 Matt Chambers
 Chris Koo
 Alex Kuzmanovic
 Kristin Leanne
 Michael Martenson
 Jacob Matzkows
 Randy McClaughry
 Mark Peromm

Charts

References 

Citations

Sources

 

2015 albums
Blessthefall albums
Fearless Records albums
Albums produced by Joey Sturgis